Jana Kalcikova (born ) is a Czech female former volleyball player. She was part of the Czech Republic women's national volleyball team.

She participated at the 2002 FIVB Volleyball Women's World Championship in Germany. On club level she played with PVK Olymp Prague.

Clubs 
 PVK Olymp Prague (2002)

References

External links 
 http://www.fivb.ch/En/Volleyball/Competitions/WorldChampionships/Women/2002/Teams/Team_updates.asp

1980 births
Living people